Zenkeria may refer to:
 Zenkeria (plant), a genus of plants in the tribe Molinieae,
 Zenkeria (bug), a genus of bugs in the tribe Petascelini.

Genus disambiguation pages